In jurisprudence, prosecutorial misconduct or prosecutorial overreach is "an illegal act or failing to act, on the part of a prosecutor, especially an attempt to sway the jury to wrongly convict a defendant or to impose a harsher than appropriate punishment." It is similar to selective prosecution. Prosecutors are bound by a sets of rules which outline fair and dispassionate conduct.

Types of misconduct
 Failure to disclose exculpatory evidence
 False confession
 Falsified evidence
 Malicious prosecution
 Prosecutorial corruption
 Retaliatory prosecution
 Selective prosecution
 Subornation of perjury

Examples and remedies

In late 1993, the 6th US Circuit Court of Appeals ruled that John Demjanjuk had been a victim of prosecutorial misconduct during a 1986 trial in which federal prosecutors withheld evidence. Demjanjuk's sentence was overturned, but he lost when his case was retried.

In the 1995 murder trial of O. J. Simpson, the defense argued that Los Angeles Police Department detective Mark Fuhrman had planted evidence at the crime scene. Although Fuhrman denied the allegations, Simpson was found not guilty, although he was later held liable for the deaths in a civil suit filed by the families of the victims. In USA Today (August 24, 1995), Francis Fukuyama stated, "[Such defenses lead to] a distrust of government and the belief that public authorities are in a vast conspiracy to violate the rights of individuals." However, such misconduct may actually be widespread in the United States. "It’s a result-oriented process today, fairness be damned," Robert Merkle, former U.S. Attorney for the Middle District of Florida, said. Prosecutors are protected from civil liability even when they knowingly and maliciously break the law in order to secure convictions, and the doctrine of harmless error can be used by appellate courts to uphold convictions despite such illegal tactics, which some argue gives prosecutors few incentives to comply with the law.

A more recent example of prosecutorial misconduct can be seen in the 2006 Duke lacrosse case. In that incident, members of the Duke University men's lacrosse team hired a female stripper for a team party. She went on to accuse three players of raping her at that party. Making the case even more volatile was the fact that the stripper was black and the three accused players were white. The actions of the prosecutor in this case, Mike Nifong, drew enormous criticism, as he proceeded with the case despite numerous inconsistencies in the accuser's story, a lack of DNA evidence conclusively linking any player to any sexual assault, and at least two of the accused having solid alibis. He also made numerous inflammatory statements to the media. The case against the players eventually collapsed; all charges were dropped, and the North Carolina Attorney General took the unusual step of declaring the players innocent. The North Carolina State Bar eventually disbarred Nifong for his actions during this case.

In 2011 a Texas man, Michael Morton was released from prison after serving nearly 25 years for the murder of his wife in 1987. He was released after DNA evidence pointed to another man as the killer. The prosecutor, Ken Anderson later pleaded guilty to withholding evidence that could have helped Morton fight the murder charge. He was sentenced to spend 10 days in jail and was also disbarred.

For an increasing number of North Carolinians, District Attorneys often enjoy both legal and political protections, making it that much harder to extricate them officially from office for their perceived misconduct. This is further exacerbated by the role media chooses to play with prosecutors. Since 2018, western North Carolina investigative journalist Davin Eldridge has exposed several instances of impropriety by area officials, including District Attorney Ashley Welch. While his reporting has proven itself as accurate, adjacent news outlets have nonetheless treated the matters as almost entirely nonexistent—opting instead to provide Welch with favorable coverage. This has left many in the community disaffected toward its justice system, political parties and media.

Despite such, the defense has been successful in roughly 1 out of 6 times it has been used from 1970 to 2003.  During that period, judges have cited misconduct by prosecutors as a reason to dismiss charges, reverse convictions, or reduce sentences in 2,012 cases, according to a study by the Center for Public Integrity released in 2003; the researchers looked at 11,452 cases in which misconduct was alleged.

A debate persists over the meaning of the term. Prosecutors have asked judges to stop using the term to refer to an unintentional error, and to restrict its use to describe a breach of professional ethics.  E. Norman Veasey, the chief justice of Delaware Supreme Court, answered one such request in 2003 by noting the term's extensive use in rulings over the past 60 years. "We believe it would be confusing to change the terminology in view of this history," he wrote in reply.

See also
Attorney misconduct
Fruit of the poisonous tree
Harmless error
Malicious Prosecution
Selective Prosecution
List of wrongful convictions in the United States

References

External links
Discovery violations have made evidence-gathering a shell game, The Pittsburgh Post-Gazette, November 24, 1998

Misconduct
Criminal defenses
Prosecution
Criminal justice ethics